Diptoindonesin A is a C-glucoside of ε-viniferin isolated from the two Dipterocarpaceae Shorea seminis and Dryobalanops aromatica.

References

External links

Resveratrol oligomers
Stilbenoid dimers
Stilbenoid glycosides
Phenol glucosides
C-glycoside natural phenols